Agamyxis pectinifrons, the spotted talking catfish, spotted raphael catfish or whitebarred catfish, is a species of thorny catfish found in the Amazon basin where it has been recorded from Bolivia, Brazil, Colombia and Peru.  This species grows to a length of  SL.

In the aquarium
A. pectinifrons is a popular aquarium fish and is often sold as the spotted raphael catfish or spotted talking catfish. It is recommended, due to the spines on this fish which would tear up a conventional net, that it is preferable to move these fish by hand. These fish need a dark refuge to hide in during the day.

References 
 

Doradidae
Catfish of South America
Fish of Bolivia
Freshwater fish of Brazil
Freshwater fish of Colombia
Freshwater fish of Peru
Fish of the Amazon basin
Fish described in 1870
Taxa named by Edward Drinker Cope